University College of the North (UCN) is a post-secondary institution located in Northern Manitoba, Canada.  UCN has a student body of approximately 2,400 annually, and a staff of approximately 400. The Chancellor of UCN is Edwin Jebb.

History

Northern Manitoba Vocational Center was established in The Pas in 1966 and the Thompson campus was opened in the early 1980s.

University College of the North was established on July 1, 2004, with the passage of the University of the North Act in the Legislative Assembly of Manitoba, and is the successor to Keewatin Community College.

Campus

UCN has two main campuses, in The Pas and Thompson. There are 12 regional centres in Churchill, Cross Lake, Easterville, Flin Flon, Pukatawagan(Mathias Colomb), Grand Rapids (Misipawistik), Nelson House (Nisichawayasihk), Norway House, Oxford House (Bunibonibee), St. Theresa Point, Split Lake, and Swan River. Nine of UCN's 12 regional centres are in First Nations communities. In partnership with local Cree Nation authorities, UCN co-sponsors public libraries in Pukatawagan (Mathias Colomb), Norway House and Chemawawin (Easterville).

Programs
UCN offers more than 40 degree, diploma, and certificate programs in the Faculty of Arts and Science, Faculty of Trades and Technology, Faculty of Health, Faculty of Education, Faculty of Business, and as part of community-based contract training and Apprenticeship training.

Aboriginal

The UCN Council of Elders provides guidance through the sharing of traditional knowledge, beliefs and values. There are Aboriginal Centres at UCN's two main campuses. The Mamawechetotan Centre in The Pas and ininiwi kiskinwamakewin Centre in Thompson offer programs that promote cross-cultural awareness. There is a great deal of diversity that is well respected.

Scholarships and bursaries
The Government of Canada sponsors an Aboriginal Bursaries Search Tool that lists over 680 scholarships, bursaries, and other incentives offered by governments, universities, and industry to support Aboriginal post-secondary participation. University College of the North scholarships for Aboriginal, First Nations and Métis students include: Manitoba Hydro Second Year to Final Year Engineering Technology Bursary

See also
Education in Canada
List of universities in the Canadian Prairies
Higher education in Manitoba

References

External links
University College of the North (Official Site)
University College of the North (Canadian Universities)

Universities and colleges in Manitoba
Educational institutions established in 2004
The Pas
Education in Thompson, Manitoba
2004 establishments in Manitoba